The Water Polo Tournament at the 1999 Pan American Games in Winnipeg, Manitoba, Canada, had a men's and a women's competition. The women were competing for the first time at the Pan American Games.

Men's competition

Teams

GROUP A

GROUP B

Preliminary round

GROUP A

July 23, 1999

July 24, 1999

July 25, 1999

GROUP B

July 23, 1999

July 24, 1999

July 25, 1999

Semi Final Round
July 27, 1999

July 28, 1999

Final round
July 29, 1999 — 7th place

July 29, 1999 — 5th place

July 30, 1999 — Bronze-medal match

July 30, 1999 — Gold-medal match

Final ranking

Women's competition

Preliminary round

July 23, 1999

July 24, 1999

July 25, 1999

July 26, 1999

July 27, 1999

Semi finals
July 28, 1999

Bronze Medal
July 30, 1999

Gold Medal
July 30, 1999

Final ranking

Medal table

References

Sports123
UOL results

P
1999
1999
Events at the 1999 Pan American Games